Jack Lund Schofield (April 25, 1923 – March 13, 2015) was an American politician, educator, and businessman.

Background
Born in Douglas, Arizona, Schofield graduated from Las Vegas High School in 1941. He then served in the United States Army Air Forces during World War II and was a pilot. Schofield also served in the Korea War. Schofield then served in the Nevada Assembly from 1971 to 1975 and was a Democrat and later served in the Nevada State Senate from 1975 to 1979. He was an alumnus of the University of Utah and University of Nevada, Reno, and University of Nevada, Las Vegas. Schofield was a general contractor and builder, developer, and educator in Las Vegas, Nevada. He went on to have a middle school named after him in 2001, for his 40 years of service
in the Clark County School District (CCSD).

References

1923 births
2015 deaths
People from Douglas, Arizona
Politicians from Las Vegas
Military personnel from Nevada
United States Army Air Forces pilots of World War II
University of Nevada, Las Vegas alumni
University of Nevada, Reno alumni
University of Utah alumni
Businesspeople from Nevada
Schoolteachers from Nevada
Democratic Party members of the Nevada Assembly
Democratic Party Nevada state senators
Las Vegas High School alumni
20th-century American businesspeople